Mashooq is a 1992 Indian Hindi-language film directed by the Mirza Brothers, starring Ayub Khan, Ayesha Jhulka in lead roles. The film's story is based on The Taming of the Shrew.

Cast
Ayub Khan as Karan
Ayesha Jhulka as Nisha
Kiran Kumar as Shankar
Raza Murad as Bar Owner
Pran as Kedarnath
Beena Banerjee as Suman

Songs
The music was composed by Shyam Surender.

References

External links 
 

1992 films
1990s Hindi-language films